Michel Avanzini (born 28 March 1989) is a Swiss former professional footballer.

External links
 Player profile on official Servette FC website
 

1989 births
People from Winterthur
Living people
Swiss men's footballers
Association football midfielders
Switzerland youth international footballers
FC Winterthur players
FC St. Gallen players
FC Gossau players
FC Lausanne-Sport players
FC Rapperswil-Jona players
Servette FC players
SC Young Fellows Juventus players
Swiss Super League players
Swiss Challenge League players
Swiss Promotion League players
Swiss 1. Liga (football) players
2. Liga Interregional players
Sportspeople from the canton of Zürich